The following radio stations broadcast on AM frequency 1647 kHz:

In Australia
 Vision Christian Radio in Mackay, Queensland
 2ME Radio Arabic in Brisbane, Queensland

References

Lists of radio stations by frequency